Whelpton is a surname. Notable people with the surname include:

Barbara Whelpton (1910–1995), English artist and author
Eric Whelpton (1894–1981), English writer and poet
Fred Whelpton (1885–1965), Australian rules footballer
Ike Whelpton (1887–1944), English footballer
John Whelpton (born 1950), historian